Moderato Wisintainer, also Visintainer, in line-ups generally Moderato, (14 July 1902 in Alegrete (RS) – 31 January 1986 in Pelotas (RS)) was a Brazilian association footballer. Moderato, who played on the right wing, took part with the Brazil national football team at the first World Cup in 1930 in Uruguay. In the 1920s he won twice the Championship of Rio de Janeiro with CR Flamengo. On several occasions he also played for the state teams of Rio and Rio Grande do Sul.

During his youth he played for EC 14 de Julho of Santana do Livramento (RS) before joining Guarani FC in his town of birth. In 1921 he moved to the newly founded club Palestra Itália, today known as Cruzeiro EC in Belo Horizonte, the capital of the state of Minas Gerais, where he stayed until 1922.

1923 he joined CR Flamengo in the then Brazilian capital Rio de Janeiro. Until 1930 he played in 147 matches for Flamengo scoring 27 goals. In 1925 and 1927 he won with the club the Championship of Rio de Janeiro. In the decisive match of the 1927 competition he scored the winning goal in a 2–1 victory over America FC, albeit being handicapped with a brace protecting a him after a recent appendix operation.

He debuted for the Brazil national team on 6 December 1925 in a 5–2 win over Paraguay in the South American Championship in Buenos Aires. He played three more matches for Brazil in this tournament, which finished second behind the hosts. In the first edition of the World Cup, 1930 in Uruguay was not selected for the first match, which Brazil lost 1–2 to Yugoslavia. In the second match against Bolivia, which Brazil won 4–0, he scored two goals and he became the second player to score for Brazil in a World Cup, after Preguinho from Rio's Fluminense FC. However, Brazil did not progress to the next round of the tournament.

After the World cup he returned to his home state where he finished his football career 1932 with his original club Guarani FC in Alegrete. With Guarani he became runner-up in the Rio Grande do Sul State Championship of 1931, losing in the final 0–3 to Grêmio FBPA of the capital Porto Alegre.

Afterwards Dr. Moderato Wisintainer worked as engineer in Pelotas (RS). He also was active as functionary for Esportivo Bento Gonçalves and in later years became an avid golf player. Moderato died in January 1986 aged 83 in Pelotas.

Honours

Club
 Campeonato Carioca (2): 
Flamengo: 1925, 1927

International goals
Brazil's goal tally first

References
 Moderato, Flapédia (per 5 April 2014).
 Marcelo Leme de Arruda, André do Nascimento Pereira: Seleção Brasileira (Brazilian National Team) 1923-1932, Rec.Sport.Soccer Statistics Foundation and RSSSF Brazil, 15 February 2014.

Notes

1902 births
1930 FIFA World Cup players
1986 deaths
Sportspeople from Rio Grande do Sul
Brazilian footballers
Brazil international footballers
Association football forwards
CR Flamengo footballers
Cruzeiro Esporte Clube players
Brazilian people of German descent